Fourth Buddhist Council is the name of two separate Buddhist council meetings. The first one was held in Sri Lanka and is traditionally attributed to the 1st century BCE. In this fourth Buddhist council the Theravadin Pali Canon was for the first time committed to writing, on palm leaves. The second one was held by the Sarvastivada school, in Kashmir around the 1st century CE.

Fourth Buddhist Council in Sri Lanka
The Fourth Buddhist council of Theravada Buddhism was held at the Anuradhapura Maha Viharaya in Sri Lanka under the patronage of Valagamba of Anuradhapura in 25 BCE, but there is a major inconsistency if this Valagamba of Anuradhapura died in 77 BCE and so was not around to patronize this Council some 52 years later. Norman places the life of this King in the period 29 BCE to 17 BCE which is in stark disagreement to a death year of 77 BCE for Valagamba of Anuradhapura:

The Dipavamsa states that during the reign of Vattagamani Abhaya (29–17 BCE) the monks who had previously remembered the Tipitaka and its commentary orally now wrote them down in books, because of the threat posed by famine, war, and the growing power of the newly established Abhayagiri vihara, which enjoyed the king's favour. The Mahavamsa also refers briefly to the writing down of the canon and the commentaries at this time

The council was held in response to a year in which the harvests in Sri Lanka were particularly poor and many Buddhist monks subsequently died of starvation. Because the Pāli Canon was at that time oral literature maintained in several recensions by dhammabhāṇakas (dharma reciters), the surviving monks recognized the danger of not writing it down so that even if some of the monks whose duty it was to study and remember parts of the Canon for later generations died, the teachings would not be lost.

After the Council, palm-leaf manuscripts containing the completed Canon were taken to other countries such as Burma, Thailand, Cambodia and Laos.

Fourth Buddhist Council in Kashmir
The Fourth Buddhist Council of the Sarvastivada tradition is said to have been convened by the Kushan emperor Kanishka in Kundalvana vihara in Kashmir. The exact location of the vihara is presumed to be around Harwan, near Srinagar. An alternate theory places its location in the Kuvana monastery in Jalandhar, though this is improbable. The Fourth Council of Kashmir is not recognized as authoritative for the Theravadins; reports of this council can be found in scriptures which were kept in the Mahayana tradition. The Mahayana tradition based some of its scriptures on (refutations of) the Sarvastivadin Abhidharma texts.

It is said that for the Fourth Council of Kashmir, Kanishka gathered 500 monks headed by Vasumitra, partly, it seems, to compile extensive commentaries on the Sarvastivadin Abhidharma, although it is possible that some editorial work was carried out upon the existing canon itself. The main fruit of this Council was the vast commentary known as the Mahāvibhāṣā ("Great Exegesis"), an extensive compendium and reference work on a portion of the Sarvastivadin Abhidharma.

See also

Buddhist councils
First Buddhist council
Second Buddhist council
Third Buddhist council
Fifth Buddhist council
Sixth Buddhist council
Pāli Canon
Sutta Pitaka
Vinaya Pitaka
Abhidhamma Pitaka

References

Bibliography
 

Buddhist council4
Buddhist councils
1st century BC in religion
1st century in religion